Keygubad Mosque) is a historical mosque of the 14th century located on Gala turn in the Old City of Baku in Azerbaijan. The mosque is on the south side of the mausoleum of Seyid Yahya Bakuvi.

History
The precise history and function of the building is controversial. Historically, Keygubad mosque was a building of mosque-madrasa which was adjacent to Darvish tomb. Abbasgulu Bakikhanov wrote about Bakuvi on his  teaching and worshipping in the mosque:  Shirvanshah Keyqubad I was in power in 1317–48. According to prominent researcher, S. Ashurbeyli, Keyqubad was grandfather of Sheikh Ibrahim.

During 1918 events the mosque was burnt by Armenian troops.

In the southern part of the lower courtyard of the Shirvanshahs Palace, only the remains of the foundation and a few arches of Keygubad mosque are left.

Architectural features
The mosque consists of a rectangle worshipping hall and a corridor in front of it. Originally on the center of the hall, there used to be 4 columns to hold the dome.  A portal was adjacent to the hall along with vestibule. On the southern wall of the hall there used to be a mihrab.

Together with the mausoleum and the Keygubad Mosque, the middle courtyard occupies a neutral position in the Shirvanshahs' palace complex due to its location.

Gallery

See also
 Sheikh Ibrahim Mosque
 Juma Mosque

References

Literature
Fərhadoğlu, Kamil (2006). İçərişəhər. Bakı: Şərq-Qərb nəşriyyatı, AMEA Arxeologiya və Etnoqrafiya İnstitutu, 256.
Fətullayev-Fiqarov, Şamil (2013). Bakının memarlıq ensiklopediyası. Bakı: Şərq-Qərb, Azərbaycan Respubliksı Memarlar İttifaqı, 528.
S. Dadaşov, M. Useynov (1955). Bakının memarlıq abidələri. Bakı: Azərbaycan SSR Elmlər Akademiyası Nəşriyyatı, 42.

Monuments and memorials in Azerbaijan
Tourist attractions in Baku
Palace of the Shirvanshahs